The 1936 Texas Mines Miners football team was an American football team that represented Texas School of Mines (now known as University of Texas at El Paso) as a member of the Border Conference during the 1936 college football season. In its eighth season under head coach Mack Saxon, the team compiled a 5–3–1 record (2–1–1 against Border Conference opponents), finished second in the conference, lost to Hardin–Simmons in the first Sun Bowl game, and outscored all opponents by a total of 92 to 86.

Schedule

References

Texas Mines
UTEP Miners football seasons
Texas Mines Miners football